Opsilia molybdaena is a species of beetle from a family Cerambycidae, that can be found in North Africa, South and Southeast Europe.

References

Beetles described in 1817
molybdaena